Pachytarsella is a genus of flies belonging to the family Lesser Dung flies.

Species
P. boharti (Richards, 1963)
P. pachypus (Richards, 1956)

References

Sphaeroceridae
Diptera of Australasia
Diptera of Asia
Brachycera genera